Vir: The Robot Boy (stylized as ViR: THE ROBOT BOY) is an Indian animated kids adventure television series that aired on Hungama TV. It is about a humanoid robot boy and his adventures. It is produced by Maya Digital Studios in association with Cosmos Entertainment Pvt. Ltd (Cosmos) based in Singapore. It premiered on 9 November 2013, with a pilot episode called "Earth In Trouble".

Vir is a humanoid robot child with human-like qualities, emotions and superhuman abilities. He is a creation of Dr. Prem Sahay and he lives with him. Sahay is a kind elderly man, and he created Vir to help others. The series follows Vir's humorous escapades as he manages to save the day with his quick thinking and a wide array of robotic abilities, along with his closest friends – Imli, the pet donkey Chulbul and Gintu.

Episodes

Characters
 Vir. Vir is a humanoid robot created by doctor Prem Sahay. He has human-like qualities and has robot gadgets. Vir is often carefree, kind, and intelligent, always helping anyone in need. His friends are his pet donkey Chulbul, his magical jinn Gintu,his best friend Imli and He also has a crush on her. His main enemy is Mad Max, an evil scientist who wants to capture him, make duplicates of him and rule over the world with their help. But Vir foils his plans every time, thus saving the world. He has a secret identity, that no one except his friends and dadaji, knows. He is the hero of Fursatganj, Robot Boy. He has 7 suits, Robot Boy suit, Diving Suit, Wing-suit, Fire-suit, Twister-Suit, Astronaut-suit, and Drilling-suit. He is a 11-year-old robot. He is voiced by Vidit Kumar.   
 Imli. Imli is one of Vir's best friends. She is highly intelligent, and pretty and is always ready to help anyone who is in trouble. She is also very protective of Vir and often jumps in to free him from one of Mad Max's traps. Her greatest dislikes are Bunty and his friends, Keki and Feki. Her friends are Chulbul, Gintu and Vir. She has a crush on Vir. She first meets Gintu at 'Bag Snatcher'. She is 11-year old girl and in "Nakli aliens" Its revealed that she has the same weight with vir. She is voiced by Rupa Bhimani.
 Gintu. Gintu is one of Vir's friends and is a magical genie. He is a chubby boy who loves eating all the time and often does mistakes that make no sense. He lacks any intelligence and is very lazy but nevertheless still helps his friends. Whenever he gets hit in the head, he loses his memory.  Vir sometimes loses his temper when Gintu does something stupid. His friends are Chulbul, Vir and Imli. When Vir calls him, he says "C-c-c-castor c-c-c-castor! You're my master, you're my master.". He is voiced by Anubhav Saha.
 Chulbul. Chulbul is one of Vir's friends who is a donkey. He always accompanies Vir to where he goes and also gets into trouble with him. He loves eating carrots. He often thinks highly of himself but is always beaten. He is always there to help his friends whenever needed. His friends are Imli, Vir, and Gintu. He is a 16-year-old donkey. He is voiced by Brian D'Costa.
 Chintu . Chintu is Gintu's childhood friend. He only appears in 'Gintu Meets Chintu.' Despite his failed ways to separate Gintu and Vir, he can not separate them.
 Principal Sir. Principal Sir is the headmaster of Vir's school. He is a kind man who always wants the best from his students. Although at first, he thought nothing of Vir, he began to admire him after the many times Vir saved the school and therefore Vir is the best-known student in the school. He is voiced by Trilok Patel.
 Bunty Chadha. Bunty Chadha is one of Vir's enemies. He is the son of Mr. and Mrs. Chadha. Because of his parents' wealth, he thinks that he is the only one that is more powerful than everyone else. Vir attacks Bunty’s father every morning, and when Bunty tries to save his father, it always ends up with Bunty being the one in trouble. Vir is always showing Bunty how much better he is than him. Bunty not only hates Vir because he attacks his father, but he also hates him because Vir is always proving that he is better than him. He tries to win and prove to everyone that he's the best. He has two friends, Keki and Feki. Being jealous of Vir, he often finds out that Vir is a robot by spying on him, but thanks to Gintu's magic, he never remembers anything. He has an uncle called Bhadijha. Gintu gives him a fake robot suit where its lasers won't harm anyone in 'Bunty the Robot Boy'. He is voiced by Sabina Malik.
 Keki and Feki. The two are the followers of Bunty and are bullies. They are twin brothers. They first appear in the episode 'Horse Race'.
 Mad Max. Mad Max is the antagonist of the series. He is a mad scientist who wants to rule over the world. He wants to capture Vir and make copies of him, and then destroy him. Vir foils his plans every time. His catchphrase is "Mad Max is mad! Very, very mad!". He has a sidekick, or more like a servant named Timbaktoon, and a cat named Mona. He also accidentally gets beaten up by Timbaktoon. He is voiced by Shailendra Pandey.
 Timbaktoon. Timbaktoon is the sidekick/ servant of Mad Max and often helps fulfill his plans. He is clumsy and careless, often getting himself into trouble while trying to capture Vir. He also accidentally beats Mad Max up. He is voiced by Mayur Vyas.
 Mona. Mona is the cat companion of Mad Max. She is very arrogant and often compliments Max by the saying “Boss, you’re genius! Super duper genius!”. She only fights against Vir in 'Vir VS Cat Mona'. She is a 9-year-old cat. She is voiced by Pooja Punjabi.
 Dr Prem Sahay/ Dadaji. Dadaji is a scientist who created his son Vir so he could save the world and its people. Dadaji is a very caring person and loves and cares for Vir very much. Dadaji's enemy is also Mad Max, and in the episode "Nakli Aliens" it is shown that they knew each other even before Vir was made. Vir deeply cares about Dadaji and is very protective of him. He is voiced by Ajay Singhal.
 Nanaji/ Magical jinn. Nanaji is the grandfather of Gintu. He is also as big as Gintu and also loves eating. He first appears in the episode "Baby Gintu" to help Gintu turn into a boy again after he turns himself into a little baby. He is a kind man with extraordinary powers.
 Mr. Chadha. Mr. Chadha is Bunty's father. He is a wealthy man who is continuously, and unknowingly by him, getting accidentally beaten up by (mostly) Vir and (sometimes) his friends. He is the second person to sometimes find out that Vir is a Robot Boy the first one being his son. He is a kind and sometimes self-centered man. He is voiced by Nandkishore Pandey.
 Mrs. Chadha. Mrs. Chadha is Bunty's mother. She is in short words and kind woman who loves looking nice and beautiful and always gets annoyed by her son's ridiculous acts. She is voiced by Meena Nahata.
 Babli. Babli is Bunty's stuck-up self-centered cousin. She only appears in 'Bunty And Babli Detectives' where she, with Bunty, tries to find out the truth behind Vir and comically fails, because of Gintu's magic.
 Mr. Sinha. Mr. Sinha is Imli's caring and kind father. Not much is said about him and neither does he appear in many episodes. He first appears at 'Horse Race'. He is also voiced by Mayur Vyas.
 Mrs. Sinha. Mrs. Sinha is Imli's pretty and kind mother. Not much is known about her either. She also first appears in 'Horse Race'. She is voiced by Mausum.
 Munnu. Munnu is a cute little kid and a friend of Vir's. He is an adorable 4-year-old who looks up to Vir. He doesn't appear in many episodes. He is voiced by Sinha.
 Kakkar Sir. Kakkar Sir is a stoic, stubborn teacher at Vir's school. As mentioned, he is very stoic and doesn't like to be bothered or interrupted. He also dislikes Vir and is often trying to prove the boy wrong in front of Principal Sir. His attempts, however, always fail. He is also voiced by Shailendra Pandey.
 Ramu, Nathu, Michael, Simon. They are thieves from Mad Max's company. After Mad Max fired them out, they worked for other villains like Uncle Bhadijha. They appear in some episodes.
 Uncle Bhadijha. He is Bunty's uncle. He was a hunter who wanted to catch animals. After Vir won against him, he never kidnapped animals. He only appears in 'The Peacock'. He is also voiced by Nandkishore Pandey. 
 Bulbul. He is the donkey opposite of Chulbul. After Gintu got him to Vir, Vir thought that he was Chulbul. He kicked Vir and Bunty. He only appears in 'Missing Chulbul'. 
 Pintu. Pintu is a bad jinn. He kidnapped Gintu in a bottle. After Vir released Gintu, Vir fought Pintu in his Twister Suit. Pintu was about to catch Vir, but the bottle Gintu was trapped in was big. As Pintu entered it, the bottle shrunk. Vir sent Pintu to Genie-land. He only appears on 'Pintu Jinn'. He is also voiced by Anubhav Saha.
 Launderer Bir. He is a launderer. After seeing Chulbul eating carrots, he led a carrot path. As Chulbul entered it, he got kidnapped by him. But Vir shot lasers in Bir's henchmen. Chulbul got safe. Bir only appears in 'Missing Chulbul'.
 Mad Robots. They are Mad Max's henchmen. When Mad Max calls them, they prove to attack Vir. But Vir attacks them badly in the end of every episode.
 Eeka Beeka Deeka Teeka. They are a group of monkeys who created chaos by stealing Mrs. Chadha's jewelry, on Bandar Shahar ke Andhar, but in the end, they became friends with Vir.
 Bandar Raja. He is a monkey who is the boss of Eeka, Beeka, Deeka, & Teeka.

Theme song
 The theme song of the show, "Vir The Robot Boy Dimaag Hai Computer Se Taiz", was written by Anish Mehta, and it was sung by Suhas Kadav.

See also 
List of Indian animated television series

References

2013 Indian television series debuts
2016 Indian television series endings
Indian children's animated adventure television series
Indian children's animated science fiction television series
Animated television series about children
Animated television series about robots
Hungama TV original programming
Disney XD (Indian TV channel) original programming
Indian children's animated superhero television series
Animated television series about monkeys
Animated television series about cats
Animated television series about animals
Animated television series about mammals
Jinn in popular culture
Genies in television